Filippo di Piero Strozzi (French: Philippe Strozzi; 1541 – 27 July 1582) was an Italian condottiero, a member of the Florentine family of the Strozzi. He fought mainly for France.

Biography
He was born in Florence to Piero Strozzi and Laudomia de' Medici. His father had been exiled from his native city, and had been received in France by Queen Catherine de' Medici, being appointed as Marshal of France. Filippo became page of the future king Francis II.

In 1557 Strozzi entered the French army. Starting from first battles in Piedmont, he fought in numerous of the battles of the 16th century. In 1558 he took part to the siege of Calais against England - his father was killed soon afterwards at the Siege of Thionville. In 1560 he was sent to Scotland to fight for the then regent Mary of Guise against Elizabeth of England, and was made lord of Épernay. Three years later he became colonel of the Royal Guards.

In 1564 he came on help to Emperor Maximilian II during the Ottoman invasion in Hungary, and the following year he faced again the Ottomans at the siege of Malta. From there he moved to Rome, called to counter the Turk menace in the Adriatic Sea, distinguishing himself in the defence of Ancona. He later fought also in Transylvania.

Returned to France in 1567, he fought against the Huguenots. Two years later he became the sole Colonel General (commander-in-chief of the army) of France, and subsequently took part to the long siege of La Rochelle. He was accompanied by his friend Pierre de Bourdeille. In 1573 he fought alongside the House of Orange against the Spaniards.

In 1581 Filippo Strozzi exchanged the position of General Commander for that of lord of Bressuire and was called by António, Prior of Crato (Portuguese claimant to the Portuguese throne against Spanish Habsburg King Philip II)  as a private mercenary. With a contingent of French, Dutch, English and Portuguese volunteers, he set sail to the Azores, a Portuguese Atlantic territory that still did not recognize Philip II as king. His fleet was, however, destroyed in the Battle of Terceira (26 July 1582) by the Spanish-Portuguese navy under the admiral Álvaro de Bazán, 1st Marquis of Santa Cruz. 

Taken prisoner, he was executed at the age of 42, by being wounded to death and then thrown into the sea from a Spanish ship, as a pirate. The harsh punishments meted out to the unfortunate Strozzi and captured members of his crews were carried out at the instructions of the Spanish admiral, despite much protest from his own crews.

1541 births
1582 deaths
Filippo di Piero
Nobility from Florence
Italian emigrants to France
16th-century condottieri
French generals
Executed military leaders
People of the French Wars of Religion
Italian people executed abroad
People executed by Spain by decapitation
People executed for piracy
Executed Italian people
16th-century executions by Spain
Military personnel from Florence
People of the Italian Wars